Berles-Monchel is a commune in the Pas-de-Calais department in the Hauts-de-France region in northern France.

Geography
A village located 11 miles (17 km) northwest of Arras on the D82 junction with the N39 road, in the valley, and the source of the river Scarpe.

Population

Sights
 The eighteenth-century château.
 The Wandelicourt chapel, dating from the eighteenth century.
 The church of Saint-Pierre, dating from the sixteenth century.

See also
Communes of the Pas-de-Calais department

References

Communes of Pas-de-Calais